The following is a list of events affecting Tamil language television in 2021 from (India (Tamil Nadu), Singapore, Malaysia, Sri Lanka and Tamil diaspora). Events listed include television show debuts, and finales; channel launches, and closures; stations changing or adding their network affiliations; and information about changes of ownership of channels or stations.

Debut Series and Shows

Soap Operas

See also
 2023 in Tamil television

References

2019 in Tamil-language television